Angharad ferch Meurig was a 9th-century Welsh noblewoman. She was the wife of Rhodri the Great of Gwynedd, and mother of Anarawd (Rhodri's successor), Cadell ap Rhodri, and Merfyn.

Life
Angharad was the daughter of Meurig, evidently the King of Seisyllwg in southwestern Wales. She married Rhodri Mawr of Gwynedd, who held power over much of Wales. Her brother Gwgon succeeded their father to the throne of Seisyllwg, but he drowned without an heir in 872. Subsequently, Angharad and Rhodri became caretakers of his kingdom. Rhodri had no standing to take the kingship himself, but the family connection allowed him to install his second son, Cadell, as king. Their first son, Anarawd, later succeeded Rhodri in Gwynedd. Their third son, Merfyn, is sometimes said to have been installed as King of Powys.

References

Year of birth missing
Year of death missing
Welsh royalty
Welsh princesses
9th-century Welsh people
9th-century Welsh women
9th-century births